Romney is a town in and the county seat of Hampshire County, West Virginia, United States. The population was 1,722 at the 2020 census.

History 
Established by consecutive acts of the Virginia House of Burgesses and approved by the governor on December 23, 1762, Romney and Mecklenburg (later renamed Shepherdstown), in Jefferson County, are the oldest towns in West Virginia. The bill containing the Act for establishing the town of Romney, in the county of Hampshire, and for other purposes therein-mentioned, is listed 20th on a list of approved "publick and private bills" and is immediately followed by An Act for establishing the town of Mecklenburg, in the county of Frederick. 

Originally settled in 1725 by hunters and traders, Romney was known as Pearsall's Flats and was the site of the French and Indian War stockade Fort Pearsall.  Named for the Cinque Ports town of Romney, Kent, England, by Thomas Fairfax, 6th Lord Fairfax of Cameron, the town still bears place names and symbols from its colonial past such as its Marsham Street, named for Robert Marsham, 2nd Baron Romney. It is also home to the West Virginia Schools for the Deaf and Blind and the nation's First Confederate Memorial in Indian Mound Cemetery.

Geography
Romney is located at  (39.344915, -78.756960).

Climate
The climate in this area is characterized by hot, humid summers and generally  cold winters.  According to the Köppen Climate Classification system, Romney has a humid continental climate, abbreviated "Cfa" on climate maps.

Transportation

Romney is served by two primary highways, the more prominent of them being U.S. Route 50. US 50 heads eastward from Romney towards Winchester and Interstate 81. To the west, US 50 intersects U.S. Route 220, climbs the Allegheny Front, briefly enters Garrett County, Maryland, and then returns to West Virginia, eventually reaching Grafton. The other primary highway serving Romney is West Virginia Route 28, which heads southward towards Moorefield and north towards Cumberland, Maryland and Interstate 68. Although not usually used for daily transport, the Potomac Eagle Scenic Railroad has its terminal here.

Demographics

2010 census
As of the census of 2010, there were 1,848 people, 843 households, and 410 families living in the city. The racial makeup of the city was 95.8% White, 2.7% African American, 0.2% Native American, 0.1% Asian, 0.1% from other races, and 1.1% from two or more races. Hispanic or Latino of any race were 1.4% of the population.

There were 843 households, of which 23.7% had children under the age of 18 living with them, 31.2% were married couples living together, 13.2% had a female householder with no husband present, 4.3% had a male householder with no wife present, and 51.4% were non-families. 46.5% of all households were made up of individuals, and 26.2% had someone living alone who was 65 years of age or older. The average household size was 2.01 and the average family size was 2.83.

The median age in the city was 41.9 years. 23.6% of residents were under the age of 18; 9.4% were between the ages of 18 and 24; 20.3% were from 25 to 44; 23% were from 45 to 64; and 23.6% were 65 years of age or older. The gender makeup of the city was 44.1% male and 55.9% female.

2000 census
As of the census of 2000, there were 1,940 people, 884 households, and 454 families living in the city. The racial makeup of the city was 96.91% White, 1.91% African American, 0.05% Native American, 0.52% Asian, 0.21% from other races, and 0.41% from two or more races. Hispanic or Latino of any race were 0.67% of the population.

There were 884 households, out of which 21.7% had children under the age of 18 living with them, 33.7% were married couples living together, 14.6% had a female householder with no husband present, and 48.6% were non-families. 44.8% of all households were made up of individuals, and 26.8% had someone living alone who was 65 years of age or older. The average household size was 1.97 and the average family size was 2.72.

In the city, the population was spread out, with 25.2% under the age of 18, 7.4% from 18 to 24, 20.1% from 25 to 44, 21.3% from 45 to 64, and 26.1% who were 65 years of age or older. The median age was 42 years. For every 100 females, there were 76.2 males. For every 100 females age 18 and over, there were 68.5 males.

The median income for a household in the city was $22,261, and the median income for a family was $34,271. Males had a median income of $28,667 versus $20,000 for females. The per capita income for the city was $15,765. About 17.2% of families and 24.6% of the population were below the poverty line, including 29.5% of those under age 18 and 18.2% of those age 65 or over.

Parks and recreation

 Hampshire High School Sports Complex, US Route 50 East
 Baseball Field, Cross Country Trails, Running Track, Soccer Field, Softball Field
 Hampshire Park & 4-H Camp, South Branch River Road (CR 8)
 Picnic Pavilions, Baseball Field, Basketball Court, Volleyball Court, Tennis Courts
 Old Romney High School, 111 School Street
 Baseball Field, Basketball Courts, Football Field, Running Track
 Romney Recreation Center, 260 School Street
 Swimming Facilities
 West Virginia Schools for the Deaf and Blind Grounds, East Main Street
 Baseball Field, Basketball Courts, Picnic Pavilions, Running Track, Soccer Field, Swimming Facilities

Notable people
 Stephen Ailes, 8th United States Secretary of the Army 
 William Armstrong, U.S. Representative
 John Rinehart Blue, state legislator
 William C. Clayton, state legislator
 Edna Brady Cornwell, First Lady of West Virginia
 John J. Cornwell, 15th Governor of West Virginia
 William B. Cornwell, lawyer and businessman
 John Collins Covell, principal of the West Virginia Schools for the Deaf and Blind
 Samuel Lightfoot Flournoy, state legislator
 Samuel Lightfoot Flournoy, lawyer
 Henry Bell Gilkeson, state legislator and principal of the West Virginia Schools for the Deaf and Blind
 Howard Hille Johnson, founder of the West Virginia Schools for the Deaf and Blind
 James Sloan Kuykendall, state legislator
 Charles S. Lawrence, Institute of Food Technologists Executive Vice President
 Thomas Bryan Martin, colonial-era Virginia politician
 Angus William McDonald, Confederate States Army colonel
 Marshall McDonald, United States Fish Commissioner
 Jerry Mezzatesta, state legislator
 Alexander W. Monroe, Speaker of the West Virginia House of Delegates
Samuel Mulledy, academic
Thomas Mulledy, academic
 Ann Pancake, author
 Chet Pancake, filmmaker
 Sam Pancake, actor
 Isaac Parsons, state legislator
 Isaac Parsons, Confederate military officer and politician
 Lee Hawse Patteson, First Lady of West Virginia
 Randall Terry, anti-abortion activist
 Christian Streit White, local politician
 John Baker White, local politician
 John Baker White, West Virginia Board of Control member
 Robert White, Attorney General of West Virginia
 Robert White, state legislator
 Charles M. Williams, Harvard Business School professor
 Andrew Wodrow, local politician
 Joshua Soule Zimmerman, state legislator

References

 Ailes, John C. Romney, West Virginia, 1762-1962. Romney, West Virginia, Hampshire Review, 1962.
 Ambler, Charles Henry. "Romney In The Civil War." West Virginia History, Charleston, West Virginia, 1943–44. Arc 1. 4: 5.
 Ansel, William H., Jr. Frontier Forts Along The Potomac And Its Tributaries. Parsons, West Virginia, McClain Publishing Company, reprint 1995.
 Brannon, Selden W. Historic Hampshire. Parsons, West Virginia, McClain Printing Company, 1976.
 Hampshire County 250th Anniversary Committee: Hampshire County, West Virginia, 1754-2004. 2004.
 Maxwell, Hu. History of Hampshire County, West Virginia: From its earliest settlement to the present. Morgantown, West Virginia, A.B. Boughner, 1897.
 Romney Town Council. Historic Romney, 1762-1937. Romney, 1937.
 Sauers, Richard A. The Devastating Hand of War: Romney, West Virginia During the Civil War. Leesburg, Virginia, Gauley Mount Press, 2000.

External links

 

 
1762 establishments in Virginia
Cities in Hampshire County, West Virginia
Cities in West Virginia
County seats in West Virginia
Hampshire County, West Virginia, in the American Civil War
Northwestern Turnpike
Populated places established in 1762
Populated places in the Cumberland, MD-WV MSA
Populated places on the South Branch Potomac River
American Civil War sites in West Virginia